Radulfus Ardens (Raoul Ardens) (died c. 1200) was a French theologian and early scholastic philosopher of the 12th century. He was born in Beaulieu, Poitou.

He is known for his Summa de vitiis et virtutibus or Speculum universale (universal mirror). It is in 14 volumes and is a systematic work of theology and ethics.

In his time, he was celebrated as a preacher, and a large number of his sermons survive. He was under the influence of Gilbert de la Porrée. He is thought to have been a student of Peter the Chanter.

He served as a chaplain to Richard I of England, through most of the 1190s.

References

Johannes Gründel, Die Lehre des Radulfus Ardens von den Verstandestugenden auf dem Hintergund seinen Seelenlehre, Munich et al.: Schöningh, 1976, (=Veröffentlichungen des Grabmann-Institutes zur Erforschung der mittelalterlichen Theologie und Philosophie; N.F., vol. 27 Münchener Universitäts-Schriften, Fachbereich katholische Theologie), simultaneously Munich, Univ., Habil.-Schr., 1966. .

External links

1200s deaths
12th-century French Roman Catholic priests
Medieval French theologians
Scholastic philosophers
Year of birth missing
12th-century French Catholic theologians
12th-century philosophers
12th-century births
12th-century Latin writers